is a Japanese Grand Prix motorcycle racer, competing for LCR Honda Idemitsu in MotoGP. He won the Japanese Road Race Championship 125cc class in 2006 and J-GP2 class in 2011.

Career

Early career
Born in Chiba, Nakagami joined the Japanese Road Race Championship in the GP125 category in 2005 joining the Harc-Pro Honda Team finishing 13th as a rookie in the series. He stayed in the Japanese 125cc championship for 2006 with Harc-Pro again, winning every race of the season; becoming the youngest-ever Japanese 125cc champion. Also in 2006, Nakagami joined the MotoGP Academy which gave him the chance to compete overseas for the first time in the Spanish CEV 125cc series. Nakagami finished in 12th position of the championship. His best result came in the second round at Jerez, finishing in 5th place.

He decided to focus on the CEV 125cc championship in 2007 with the MotoGP Academy. Nakagami's results improved in 2007, and he finished in 6th place overall with a 3rd-place finish at Valencia as his best result. Nakagami also received his first 125cc World Championship wildcard entry at the final round of the season in Valencia, qualifying in 20th position but failing to finish the race.

He impressed enough to secure a full-time ride in the 125cc World Championship for 2008, joining the Italian I.C. Team riding an Aprilia, he finished the season in 24th overall with a best finish of 8th place at Donington Park. For 2009, Nakagami joined another Italian team, Ongetta I.S.P.A., again on an Aprilia RS125. He improved his overall performance, finishing 16th overall with his best results being two 5th places at a wet Le Mans and at Donington Park.

Despite having offers to remain in the 125cc championship in 2010, Nakagami decided to return to Japan and rejoin the Harc-Pro team, He won the Suzuka 8 Hours in 2010 and competing the Japanese ST600 championship aboard a Honda. Nakagami won the first race of the season at Tsukuba. He went on to finish 8th overall. He remained with Harc-Pro in 2012, but changed classes and entered the J-GP2 class aboard a Honda HP6. Nakagami won 5 of the 6 races during the season and the championship, despite not competing in the Okayama round due to injuries sustained when he was substituting at the Motegi Moto2 World Championship round for the Italtrans Racing Team.

Moto2 World Championship

Italtrans Racing Team (2012–2013)

2012
Nakagami did enough during his substitute display to earn a full-time ride for the Italtrans Racing Team in the 2012 Moto2 World Championship riding a Kalex with a Honda CBR600 engine. He finished his rookie season 15th in the standings with a best result of 5th at Jerez.

2013
For 2013, Nakagami remained in Moto2 with Italtrans aboard a Kalex. At the opening round at Losail, Nakagami achieved his first podium in Grand Prix racing with a 3rd-place finish. At Le Mans, Nakagami earned his first pole position in Grand Prix racing. Nakagami achieved his second career Grand Prix podium with a second-place finish behind Esteve Rabat at Indianapolis; he led most of the race but was passed in the closing laps and finished less than a second from victory. He took his second pole of the season at the Czech Grand Prix, at Brno; he went on to take his second successive second-place finish, behind Mika Kallio. He once again took pole at the British Grand Prix at Silverstone and again finished second, this time behind Championship leader and home rider Scott Redding. At Misano, Nakagami finished second for the fourth race in a row; he led the majority of the race before he was passed by Pol Espargaró in the closing laps. He finished the season 8th overall with 149 points.

Idemitsu Honda Team Asia (2014–2017)

2014
For 2014 he signed to ride for Tadayuki Okada's team, Idemitsu Honda Team Asia. A positive start to the season with a second-place finish at Qatar was denied as he was disqualified for technical reasons. Nakagami struggled for the rest of the year with bike set-up, and finished the season in 22nd position. Despite the struggles of 2014,

2015
Nakagami remained with Honda Team Asia for 2015. He managed to improve and finished on the podium in Misano, ultimately matching his 2013 result of 8th overall with 100 points.

2016
In 2016, he scored his first victory in Assen. He collected three third-place finishes and eight top-5 finished to end the season 6th in points, his overall best finish in the Moto2 class.

2017
Continuing with Honda Team Asia in 2017, he won at Silverstone and claimed three third-place finishes, and ranked 7th in points.

MotoGP World Championship

LCR Honda Idemitsu (2018–present)

2018
Nakagami moved up to MotoGP in 2018, signing with LCR Team to ride a year-old Honda remaining with Idemitsu sponsorship. With regular finishes in the low point-scoring positions, he completed his rookie season with 33 points, and 20th in the championship.

2019
In October 2018 it was confirmed that Nakagami would remain at LCR Honda on a 2018-spec machine for the 2019 MotoGP season beside teammate Cal Crutchlow. In the first half of the season he regularly achieved top 10 finishes, but a heavy crash at the Dutch TT and a subsequent shoulder injury led to a drop in form. He elected to prematurely end his season after his home Grand Prix to undergo surgery repairing his damaged shoulder, and recover before the 2020 season. He was replaced for the final three rounds by KTM-exile Johann Zarco. Nakagami ultimately finished the season in 13th position with 74 points, more than doubling his point tally from his rookie season.

2020
In mid-October 2019, LCR Honda confirmed Nakagami would remain with the team for another season on a year-old machinery in 2020. After opening round crashes and subsequent injuries for teammate Crutchlow and Honda factory rider Marc Márquez, Nakagami quickly emerged as Honda's top rider in the first half of the season, finishing as the top Honda rider (always within the top 10) and scoring all manufacturer's championship points for the marque in the first eight rounds. At the Teruel Grand Prix, Nakagami qualified on pole position, the first pole for a Japanese rider in nearly 16 years. He finished the year 10th in the championship, with 116 points.

2021
In October 2020, based on his strong early season performances, Honda and LCR announced that Nakagami would remain with the team at least until the end of 2022 (his first multi-year contract in the MotoGP class) and would receive factory-spec machinery from 2021. Unfortunately for Nakagami, the 2021 Honda bike was one of the weakest in recent years, with Honda drivers regularly finishing on the cusp, or sometimes even outside the top 10. Nakagami's season high result was a 4th place in Jerez, overall ending the season just 15th in the standings, with 76 points, 6 in front of teammate Álex Márquez.

2022
Nakagami stayed with this team for 2022.

2023
Nakagami is due to stay with the same team for the 2023 season, parterning his 2023 teammate Alex Rins.

Career statistics

Grand Prix motorcycle racing

By season

By class

Races by year
(key) (Races in bold indicate pole position, races in italics indicate fastest lap)

Suzuka 8 Hours results

References

 Nakagami's official MotoGP profile

External links

 
 

1992 births
Living people
Japanese motorcycle racers
125cc World Championship riders
Moto2 World Championship riders
People from Chiba (city)
LCR Team MotoGP riders
MotoGP World Championship riders